Viner Sound is a sound on the northwest side of Gilford Island and northeast of Baker Island in the Central Coast of British Columbia, Canada.

References

Central Coast of British Columbia
Sounds of British Columbia